The 1906 Virginia Orange and Blue football team represented the University of Virginia as an independent during the 1906 college football season. Led by William C. "King" Cole in his second and final season as head coach, the Orange and Blue compiled a record of 7–2–2.

Schedule

References

Virginia
Virginia Cavaliers football seasons
Virginia Orange and Blue football